Xenorma exturbata is a moth of the family Notodontidae. It is found in Guatemala.

References

Moths described in 1925
Notodontidae